Martina Carraro (born 21 June 1993) is an Italian swimmer. She competed at the 2020 Summer Olympics, in 100 m breaststroke and 200 m breaststroke. She was European champion in short course in the 100 m breaststroke at the 2019 European Short Course Swimming Championships in Glasgow, Scotland.

Career

2012–2018
In 2012, Carraro moved to Bologna, joining the Swimming Club Azzurra 1991 led by the coach Fabrizio Bastelli. On 9 July 2015, at the 2015 Gwangju Universiade, he sets the Italian record in the long course on 50 meters breaststroke, with a time of 30.89 in the semifinal, improving his previous record of 31.00 set in Rome during the  2015. Subsequently, she still improves this record during the 2015 Kazan World Championships in heats with a time of 30.83, a record that will be later broken by Arianna Castiglioni. 

In 2016 she enlisted in the Fiamme Azzurre Sports Group, than competed in the women's 100 metre breaststroke event at the 2016 Summer Olympics.

2019–present
On 23 July 2019, at the Gwangju World Championships, she won the bronze in the 100 meters, with a time of 1:06.36, behind the American Lilly King and the Russian Julija Efimova. In 2020 she qualified to represent Italy at the 2020 Summer Olympics. In 2021, she won two bronze medals with the relay team at the Swimming European Championships Hungary 2020.

At the 2022 European Aquatics Championships, held in Rome, she won the silver medal in the 200 metre breaststroke with a time of 2:23.64, finishing 0.37 seconds behind gold medalist Lisa Mamié of Switzerland.

See also
 50 m breaststroke - Women long course all-time top 25

References

External links
 

1993 births
Living people
Italian female swimmers
Olympic swimmers of Italy
Swimmers at the 2016 Summer Olympics
Swimmers at the 2020 Summer Olympics
Swimmers of Fiamme Azzurre
Sportspeople from Genoa
Swimmers at the 2010 Summer Youth Olympics
Medalists at the FINA World Swimming Championships (25 m)
Universiade medalists in swimming
Swimmers at the 2018 Mediterranean Games
Mediterranean Games silver medalists for Italy
Mediterranean Games medalists in swimming
Universiade bronze medalists for Italy
Italian female breaststroke swimmers
Medalists at the 2015 Summer Universiade
European Aquatics Championships medalists in swimming
21st-century Italian women